Lophocyonidae is an extinct family of feliform carnivorans from the Miocene of Europe.

Taxonomy

Classification
Lophocyonidae was previously treated as a subfamily of Hyaenidae, Procyonidae, or Viverridae, but Morales et al. (2019) recognized it as a distinct family in its own right. Distinguishing features of lophocyonids include the molarization of the anterior premolars (P3 and p4), the lophodont adaptation of the molar dentition and the complex morphology of the incisors.

Phylogenetic tree
The phylogenetic relationships of Lophocyonidae are shown in the following cladogram:

References

Miocene feliforms
Miocene mammals of Europe
Miocene first appearances
Miocene extinctions
Prehistoric carnivorans of Europe
Prehistoric mammal families